Aplysiopsis elegans is a species of sacoglossan sea slug, a shell-less marine opisthobranch gastropod mollusk in the family Hermaeidae.

Distribution
This species occurs in the Mediterranean Sea and in the Atlantic Ocean off Portugal and Spain.

Description
The body has a length of 10 mm to 12 mm.

References

 Trinchese S., 1874: Intorno ai generi Hermaeina e Acanthopsole; Memorie dell'Accademia delle Scienze dell'Istituto di Bologna (3) 5: 73-80 pl. 1
 Gofas, S.; Le Renard, J.; Bouchet, P. (2001). Mollusca. in: Costello, M.J. et al. (eds), European Register of Marine Species: a check-list of the marine species in Europe and a bibliography of guides to their identification. Patrimoines Naturels. 50: 180-213.

Hermaeidae
Gastropods described in 1835